"Something's Gotta Give" is a song written by Craig Wiseman and Tony Mullins, and recorded by American country music artist LeAnn Rimes.  It was released in December 2005 as the third single from her seventh studio album This Woman. The song reached a peak of #2 on the Hot Country Songs chart in mid-2006, becoming Rimes' highest-peaking country single since the number one "One Way Ticket (Because I Can)" in 1996-1997. The #1 position was held by "Summertime" by Kenny Chesney (also co-written by Wiseman). The song also won ASCAP awards for its writers.

Content
"Something's Gotta Give" is an up-tempo song describing a female character named Jenny who is in her thirties, but unable to find a male companion who is suitable for her, after having failed several times. In the chorus, she says that "something's gotta give" for her to find the one that she wants.

Music video
The music video was released in March 2006. Directed by David McClister, it has Rimes portraying every female role. It shows Rimes performing the song in different parts of a loft, as well as Jenny (portrayed by Rimes) trying to find the perfect man. Every person that shows up at her door ceases to impress her, but as she is carrying a load of laundry, she bumps into one final guy, making her drop a bra. She gives him a happy smirk, and realizes he is the one she was looking for. He picks her bra up from the floor, and the two end up cuddling on the couch with a teddy bear he gave her.

Charts

Year-end charts

References

External links
  

2006 singles
2005 songs
LeAnn Rimes songs
Songs written by Craig Wiseman
Song recordings produced by Dann Huff
Curb Records singles
Songs written by Tony Mullins